Jacklyn O'Donnell (born January 20, 1941) is a retired American actress who was active from 1956 until 1970. She had regular starring roles on two television series, and performed on stage and in films. From September 1961 on she used the name "Erin O'Donnell" for billing credits.

Early life
She was born Jacklyn Pearl O'Donnell in Los Angeles, California on January 20, 1941, to Jack and Aurine Hayes O'Donnell. She had one older brother. She was reared by her maternal grandparents who started her on piano and ballet lessons at age five. She completed her elementary education in Inglewood, California, then transferred to the Hollywood Professional School, from which she graduated in 1957 at age 16.

While still in school she had performed in a piano duo called the Duoettes with Anna Fagerlin. They played both popular and classical selections for Women's Social Clubs. She also began acting at age 15, having a major role in a professional stage production, A Room Full of Roses. The Los Angeles Times drama critic called her performance as a troubled teenager "wonderful" though a later article indicates her stage debut was as an unpaid apprentice.

Early career
Still a senior in high school, O'Donnell signed with the Jeanne Halliburton talent agency, which advertised her for ingenue parts in casting directories. She had parts in five television episodes during 1957, two of them for the anthology series Matinee Theater, as well as Father Knows Best, The Life of Riley, and Bachelor Father.

During March 1958 she did her second stage performance, a feature role in A Man Called Peter.

The Ed Wynn Show

O'Donnell was placed under contract to Thalia-Keethwyn Productions in May 1958 for a television show scheduled that Fall. The Ed Wynn Show would be the third television series for the veteran comic actor Ed Wynn. O'Donnell and Sherry Alberoni would play Wynn's granddaughters. O'Donnell drew lots of publicity during the fall of 1958 for this show, in which she played a college coed living at home. Despite an engaging cast, which included Herb Vigran and Myrna Fahey, the show lasted for only fifteen episodes. NBC cancelled it and moved Steve Canyon to its time slot in early January 1959.

Film and television
For 1959 O'Donnell did two anthology series on television, Goodyear Theatre and The DuPont Show. She also starred in her first film, an independently produced thirty-minute short called Teenage Challenge. The director of this short, William F. Claxton, would also direct O'Donnell's first feature length film Young Jesse James, shot in 1959 but not released until August 1960. After completing her work in this film, O'Donnell flew to Phoenix, Arizona for a supporting role in The Late Christopher Bean.

Most of 1960 was disappointing for O'Donnell. She had only one television performance, on Zane Grey Theatre, and when Young Jesse James was released in August the New York Times reviewer described her as "drab". However, things picked up towards the end of the year when she was cast in a new television series.

Westinghouse Playhouse

NBC bought a thirty-minute television program from Revue Studios for broadcast on Friday nights starting in January 1961. The show, called Westinghouse Playhouse, was not an anthology series as the name might suggest, but a sitcom loosely based on events in the real family life of star Nanette Fabray. O'Donnell was cast as Fabray's new seventeen year old step-daughter, who initially resents her father's (Wendell Corey) re-marriage. The show also featured Bobby Diamond and Doris Kemper, and late in the series, Mimi Gibson.

O'Donnell appeared in all twenty-six episodes of the series; a few of them were based around her character. However, within a few weeks the series was already being called Nanette Fabray or The Fabray Show in acknowledgement of the overwhelming presence of the energetic star.

Though the cast was considered good by critics, the show's writing "depended on developments which were easily foreseen and completely predictable". The show was not renewed by NBC and aired its final episode in early July 1961. The cancellation precipitated a major change in O'Donnell's career.

Later career
At age twenty, O'Donnell decided to change her agents and her billing name. She left Halliburton for the Herman Zimmerman agency, and by September 1961 was billed as "Erin O'Donnell". Having foregone accumulated name recognition, she found 1962 a slow year. She had two films, a light comedy Saintly Sinners, and Incident in an Alley, a noir drama based on a Rod Serling story. Both movies had been filmed in 1961. She also did one television show that year.

The following year (1963) saw her starting to break out of teenage typecasting, as she played more mature roles on four narrative dramas: Perry Mason, Arrest and Trial, and two episodes of Ben Casey. She also did a week-long run on stage in Just for Tonight, which starred Gloria Swanson. By 1964 she had lost the babyface look that spelled "teenager" to casting directors, and was graduated from ingenue status to leading woman. That year she had performances on six different television shows, including Temple Houston, The Danny Thomas Show, and Wendy and Me.

She had work on three television series for 1965: Mister Roberts, My Brother the Angel,  and two episodes of Bonanza. However, she did only one dramatic television series in 1967, and by 1970 finished out her performing career with a minor part in a mixed genre film, Hell's Bloody Devils.

Oldsmobile commercials
Starting in fall 1966 O'Donnell featured in TV commercials for 1967 Oldsmobile cars. The commercials were popular and landed her at least one talk show appearance. O'Donnell told one interviewer they generated more publicity for her than anything in her dramatic career. She was reported to be in negotiation with a movie studio as a result. An apocryphal rumor was circulated by newspaper columnist Walter Winchell that she had spent the money earned from the commercials on a Ford automobile.

Personal life
At seventeen, O'Donnell was described as being 5'2" (157.5 cm), 105 pounds (47.6 kg), with "brown eyes and honey-blond hair".
 
O'Donnell gave an interview in 1967 to beauty columnist Lydia Lane in which she mentioned having attended college where she experienced a broken romance. No other details about her personal life as an adult are available; she seems to have escaped attention from gossip columnists and fan magazines.

Stage performances

Filmography

Notes

References

External links
 1967 Oldsmobile Commercials with Erin O'Donnell

American actresses
1941 births
Living people